The 1998 Franklin Templeton Tennis Classic was a men's tennis tournament played on outdoor hard courts in Scottsdale, Arizona in the United States that was part of the International Series of the 1998 ATP Tour. It was the 11th edition of the tournament and was held from March 2 through March 9, 1998. Unseeded Andre Agassi, who entered the competition on a wildcard, won the singles title, his third at the event after 1993 and 1994.

Finals

Singles

 Andre Agassi defeated  Jason Stoltenberg 6–4, 7–6(7–3)
 It was Agassi's 2nd title of the year and the 37th of his career.

Doubles

 Cyril Suk /  Michael Tebbutt defeated  Kent Kinnear /  David Wheaton 4–6, 6–1, 7–6
 It was Suk's 1st title of the year and the 18th of his career. It was Tebbutt's only title of the year and the 2nd of his career.

References

External links
 ITF tournament edition details

Franklin Templeton Classic
1998
 
Franklin Templeton Classic
Franklin Templeton Classic
Franklin Templeton Classic